Rosa Vicens Mas  (born 25 June 2000) is a Spanish tennis player.

Vicens Mas has a career-high singles ranking by the Women's Tennis Association (WTA) of 214, achieved on 6 March 2023. She also has a career-high WTA doubles ranking of 285, achieved on 30 January 2023. She has won nine singles and one doubles titles on the ITF Women's Circuit.

Career
In March 2023, Vicens Mas became the champion in Tucumán, Argentina by defeating Brazilian Carolina Alves.

Grand Slam performance timeline

Singles

ITF finals

Singles: 15 (9 titles, 6 runner-ups)

Doubles: 2 (1 titles, 1 runner-ups)

References

External links
 
 
 Rosa Vicens Mas  at the Tennis Explorer

2000 births
Living people
Spanish female tennis players